Mambwe District is a district of Zambia, located in Eastern Province. 
Mambwe District inhabits the Luangwa Valley between the 13th and 14th parallel of south latitude. The Kunda name for this area is "Malambo''.   

The land is bounded on the west by the Luangwa River, on the south by the Lusangazi River and on the north by the Chisitu River. It is approximately 700km east of Zambia’s capital city – Lusaka – and borders Lundazi district to the north, Mpika to the north-west, Serenje to the west and Petauke to the south-west. Katete is in the south while Chipata is on the south-east side of the district.  

The capital lies at Mambwe named after the great leader of the Kunda people during their migration from the Congo. 
In 2022, City Population, quoting census provisional figures from the Central Statistical Office, put the population of Mambwe District at 119, 313  The Kunda represent about 80 percent of the population in the six Kunda chiefdoms under the Kunda chiefs namely: HRH Senior Chief Nsefu, HRH Chief Malama, HRH Chief Msoro, HRH Chief Mnkhanya, HRH Chief Kakumbi and HRH Chief Jumbe.  

The district is home of the world-renowned South Luangwa National Park, one of the greatest wildlife sanctuaries in the world.  

The district has one parliamentary constituency called Malambo Constituency.  and 15 Wards namely: Chikowa, Chipako, Chipapa, Chisengu, Jumbe, Kakumbi, Kasamanda, Malama, Mdima, Mnkhanya, Mphomwa, Msoro, Ncheka, Nsefu and Nyakatokoli.

References

Districts of Eastern Province, Zambia